In geology, the Arenig (or Arenigian) is a time interval during the Ordovician period and also the suite of rocks which were deposited during this interval.

History 
The term was first used by Adam Sedgwick in 1847 with reference to the "Arenig Ashes and Porphyries" in the neighbourhood of Arenig Fawr, in Merioneth, North Wales. The rock-succession in the Arenig district has been recognized by W. G. Fearnsides (“On the Geology of Arenig Fawr and Moel Llanfnant", Q.J.G.S. vol. lxi., 1905, pp. 608–640, with maps). The above succession is divisible into:

 A lower series of gritty and calcareous sediments, the "Arenig Series" as it is now understood;
 A middle series, mainly volcanic, with shale, the "Llandeilo Series"; and
 The shale and limestones of the Bala or Caradoc Stage.

It was to the middle series (2) that Sedgwick first applied the term "Arenig". In the typical region and in North Wales generally the Arenig series appears to be unconformable upon the Cambrian rocks; this is not the case in South Wales.

The Arenig series is represented in North Wales by the Garth Grit and Ty Obry beds, by the Shelve series of the Corndon district, the Skiddaw Slates of the Lake District, the Ballantrae Group of Ayrshire, and by the Ribband Series of slates and shale in Wicklow and Wexford. It may be mentioned here that the "Llanvirn" Series of H. Hicks was equivalent to the bifidus shale and the Lower Llandeilo Series.

Geochronology 
In the geologic timescale, the Arenig or Arenigian refers to an age of the Early Ordovician epoch, between 477.7 and 470 million years ago, contemporary with the Floian of the ICS, based on a section in Sweden (Diabasbrottet quarry) and with the same boundaries. The Arenig and Floian rocks are the upper part of the Lower Ordovician and follow the Tremadocian (Gasconadian in North America) which is the lower part. Either is followed by the Middle Ordovician ICS Dapingian or by the Llanvirnian of older chronologies. The Arenig and equivalent Floian are represented in North America by the upper three stages of the Canadian which is followed by the Middle Ordovician Whiterockian which is the lower part of the now shortened Chazyan.

Events
The Arenig rocks were deposited during a sudden worldwide rise in sea level resulting in widespread marine transgression. The early Ordovician surge in marine diversity also began around this time.

Brachiopod fauna
Incertae sedis brachiopods of the Floian
Eurorthisina
Tegulella

Acrotretida of the Floian

Acanthambonia
Cyrbasiotreta
Eoconulus
Issedonia
Karnotreta
Lurgiticoma
Multispinula
Mylloconotreta
Numericoma
Orthisocrania
Polylasma
Pomeraniotreta
Pseudocrania
Scaphelasma
Schizotreta
Torynelasma

Lingulida of the Floian

Acanthorthis
Aulonotreta
Dictyobolus
Ectenoglossa
Elliptoglossa
Monobolina
Paldiskites
Paterula
Pseudolingula
Quasithambonia
Rafanoglossa
Volborthia

Orthida of the Floian

Acanthorthis
Acanthotoechia
Anchigonites
Angusticardinia
Anomalorthis
Antigonambonites
Apomatella
Astraborthis
Crossiskenidium
Dalmanella
Desmorthis
Diparelasma
Eodiorthelasma
Eosotrematorthis
Estlandia
Euorthisina
Famatinorthis
Fasciculina
Ferrax
Ffynnonia
Fistulogonites
Glossorthis
Glypterina
Hesperonomiella
Incorthis
Jaanussonites
Ladogiella
Lomatorthis
Monorthis
Munhella
Nereidella
Neumania
Nocturneilla
Notoscaphidia
Oligorthis
Orthambonites
Orthidiella
Orthidium
Orthis
Oslogonites
Panderina
Paralenorthis
Paurorthina
Paurorthis
Phragmorthis
Platystrophia
Platytoechia
Polytoechia
Pomatotrema
Prantlina
Productorthis
Progonambonites
Protohesperonomia
Protoskenidiodes
Pseudomimella
Raunites
Rhynchorthis
Shoshonorthis
Sinorthis
Taphrorthis
Tarfaya
Treioria
Trematorthis
Valcourea
Virgoria

Paternida of the Floian
Dictyonites

Pentamerida of the Floian

Acanthorthis
Acanthoglypha
Boreadocamara
Camerella
Doloresella
Hesperotrophia
Idiostrophia
Imbricatia
Karakulina
Liricamera
Lycophoria
Porambonites
Rectotrophia
Rosella
Rugostrophia
Stenocamara
Syntrophia
Syntrophinella
Xenelasma

Strophomenida
Strophomenida of the Floian

Acanthorthis
Ahtiella
Aporthophyla
Borua
Calyptolepta
Christiania
Ingria
Leptestia
Petroria
Plectambonites
Reinversella
Schedophyla
Taffia
Tourmakeadia

Trimerellida of the Floian
Dinobolus

Cephalopoda 
Actinocerida
Metactinoceras
Ordosoceras
Polydesmia

Upper 
The following is a list of Actinocerid genera whose fossils are geochronologically found first in upper Arenig strata. These genera may survive into later portions of the Arenig stage, or even into later geological stages. This list should not be thought of in terms of the lifespan of the genera included.

Leurorthoceras
Nybyoceras
Actinoceras
Wutinoceras
Ormoceras
Adamsoceras
Georgina

Orthocerida 
Orthocerids of the Floian
Eobactrites

Barrandeocerida of the Floian
Plectoceras

Ellesmerocerida of the Floian

Amsleroceras
Apocrinoceras
Avoceras
Bakeroceras
Baltoceras
Catoraphinoceras
Cochlioceras
Copiceras
Clelandoceras
Cumberloceras
Cyclostomiceras
Cyrtobaltoceras
Desioceras
Diaphoroceras
Diastoloceras
Dwightoceras
Dyscritoceras
Ectocycloceras
Endorioceras
Eocyckistomiceras
Eothinoceras
Hemichoanella
Irianoceras
Kyminoceras
Lawrenceoceras
Meikeloceras
Microbaltoceras
Monogonoceras
Ogygoceras
Pictetoceras
Protocycloceras
Quebecoceras
Rangeroceras
Rhabdiferous
Rioceras
Rudolfoceras
Smithvilloceras
Somalinautilus
Somalinautilus
Somalinautilus
Vassaroceras
Veneficoceras
Ventroloboceras

Endocerida

Campendoceras
Dartonoceras
Kaipingoceras
Kugeloceras
Lobosiphon
Manitouoceras
Mcqueenoceras
Mysticoceras
Notocycloceras
Oderoceras
Parapiloceras
Phragmosiphon
Platysiphon
Pliendoceras
Retroclitendoceras
Stenosiphon
Subpenhsioceras
Utoceras
Yorkoceras
Vaginoceras
Chisiloceras
Cyrtovaginoceras
Tallinnoceras
Juaboceras
Penhsioceras
Ventrolobendoceras

Lower
The following is a list of Endocerid genera whose fossils are geochronologically found first in lower Arenig strata. These genera may survive into later portions of the Arenig stage, or even into later geological stages. This list should not be thought of in terms of the lifespan of the genera included.

Allopiloceras
Choreanoceroides
Escharendoceras
Lebetoceras
Loxochoanella
Sewardoceras
Telleroceras
Clitendoceras
Coreanoceras
Cotteroceras
Piloceras
Endoceras
Proterovaginoceras
Cyrtendoceras
Anthoceras
Chaohuceras
Proterocameroceras
Thylacoceras

Upper
The following is a list of Endocerid genera whose fossils are geochronologically found first in upper Arenig strata. These genera may survive into later portions of the Arenig stage, or even into later geological stages. This list should not be thought of in terms of the lifespan of the genera included.

Allocotoceras
Cassinoceras
Chihlioceras
Cyclocyrtendoceras
Cyptendoceras
Kirkoceras
Lobendoceras
Najaceras
Protocyclendoceras
Yehlioceras
Nanno 
Dideroceras
Lobocyclendoceras
Meniscoceras
Paracyclendoceras
Cacheoceras
Perkinsoceras
Williamsoceras
Manchuroceras
Schmidtoceras

Intejocerida of the Floian
Bajkaloceras
Evencoceras
Intejoceras
Rossoceras

Oncocerids of the Floian
Phthanoncoceras
Valhalloceras

Nautiloids of the Floian

Buttsoceras
Centroonoceras
Gangshanoceras
Geisonoceras
Glenisteroceras
Michelinoceras
Orthoceras
Oxfordoceras
Rhynchorthoceras
Stereoplasmoceras
Tajaroceras
Wardoceras

Tarphycerida
Deltoceras
Pseudancistroceras
Seelyoceras

Lower

Alaskoceras
Moreauoceras
Pilotoceras
Shumardoceras
Pycnoceras
Campbelloceras
Aphetoceras

Upper

Aethoceras
Bentoceras
Centrotarphyceras
Clytoceras
Cycloplectoceras
Eichwaldoceras
Eurystomites
Hardmanoceras
Holmiceras
Pionoceras
Trocholitoceras
Wichitoceras
Tarphyceras
Litoceras
Curtoceras
Arkoceras
Estonioceras
Tragoceras

Trilobite fauna
Trilobites of the Floian
Canningella
Gogoella
Macrogrammus
Priceaspis
Thymurus

Agnostida of the Floian'
Galbagnostus
Geragnostella

Asaphida of the Floian

Phthanoncoceras
Ampyx
Ampyxoides
Anebolithus
Asaphus
Aspidaeglina
Australopyge
Bergamia
Bohemopyge
Borogothus
Bumastides
Ceratolithus
Cloacaspis
Cnemidopyge
Degamella
Dionide
Dionidella
Ellipsotaphrus
Falanapis
Famatinolithus
Globampyx
Gog
Hanchungolithus
Hoekaspis
Hungioides
Hunnebergia
Isocolus
Isoteloides
Lachnostoma
Lannacus
Lapidaria
Liomegalaspides
Megalaspidella
Megalaspides
Mendolaspis
Merlinia
Microparia
Mioptychopyge
Myttonia
Ningkianolithus
Niobides
Ogmasaphus
Ogyginus
Ogygiocaris
Opipeuter
Parabasilicus
Paraptychopyge
Plesiomegalaspis
Presbynileus
Pricyclopyge
Psilacella
Psilocara
Ptychopyge
Rhombampyx
Robergiella
Seleneceme
Stapeleyella
Taihungshania
Thysanopyge
Trigonocercella
Tungtzuella
Zhenganites
Zuninaspis

Corynexichida of the Floian

Bumastus
Dysplanus
Ectillaenus
Panderia
Phillipsinella
Pseudocalymene
Theamataspis

Lichida of the Floian

Apatolichas
Autoloxolichas
Lichakephalina
Metopolichas

Odontopleurida of the Floian

Phthanoncoceras
Ceratocephala
Diacanthaspis
Selenopeltis

Phacopida of the Floian

Bathycheilus
Calymenella
Ceraurinella
Colobinion
Colpocoryphe
Cybelopsis
Cybelurus
Diaphanometopus
Dindymene
Eccoptochile
Ectenonotus
Encrinurella
Encrinuroides
Evropeites
Gyrometopus
Heliomeroides
Kanoshia
Kawina
Kolymella
Lehua
Lyrapyge
Neseuretus
Nieszkowskia
Ormathops
Ovalocephalus
Placoparia
Platycoryphe
Pliomeridius
Pliomerops
Protoencrinurella
Protopliomerella
Pseudocybele
Pterygometopus
Strotactinus
Sycophantia
Synhomalonotus
Toletanaspis
Xystocrania

Proetida of the Floian

Acidiphorus
Bathyuriscops
Benthamaspis
Biolgina
Bolbocephalus
Carolinites
Celmus
Ceratopeltis
Decoroproetus
Dimeropygiella
Eleutherocentrus
Goniophrys
Goniotelina
Grinnellaspis
Ischyrophyma
Ischyrotoma
Lutesvillia
Oenonella
Petigurus
Rananasus
Raymondaspis
Telephina

Ptychopariida of the Floian

Anaximander
Annamitella
Balnibarbi
Bulnibarbi 
Bvalbardites
Circulocrania
Endymionia
Etheridgaspis
Furcalithus
Gymnostomix
Lacorsalina
Leioshumardia
Lordshillia
Nambeetella
Novakella
Oopsites
Peraspis
Phorocephala
Porterfieldia
Prosopiscus
Pytine
Sagavia
Selenoharpes
Stegnopsis
Stenorhachis
Svalbardites
Tasmanocephalus
Turgicephalus
Yinpanolithus

External links 
 palaeos

References

Early Ordovician